Chris Conrad may refer to:

 Chris Conrad (actor) (born 1970), American actor
 Chris Conrad (American football) (born 1975), American football player
 Chris Conrad (author) (born 1953), American author and activist

See also
 Chris and Conrad, an American contemporary Christian music duo